Diethylzinc (C2H5)2Zn, or DEZ, is a highly pyrophoric and reactive organozinc compound consisting of a zinc center bound to two ethyl groups. This colourless liquid is an important reagent in organic chemistry. It is available commercially as a solution in hexanes, heptane, or toluene, or as a pure liquid.

Synthesis
Edward Frankland first reported the compound in 1848 from zinc and ethyl iodide, the first organozinc compound discovered. He improved the synthesis by using diethyl mercury as starting material. The contemporary synthesis consists of the reaction of a 1:1 mixture of ethyl iodide and ethyl bromide with a zinc-copper couple, a source of reactive zinc.

Structure
The compound crystallizes in a tetragonal body-centered unit cell of space group symmetry I41md. In the solid-state diethylzinc shows nearly linear Zn centres. The Zn-C bonds measure 194.8(5) pm, while the C-Zn-C angle is slightly bent with 176.2(4)°. The structure of the gas-phase shows a very similar Zn-C distance (195.0(2) pm).

Uses
Despite its highly pyrophoric nature, diethylzinc is an important chemical reagent. It is used in organic synthesis as a source of the ethyl carbanion in addition reactions to carbonyl groups. For example, the asymmetric addition of an ethyl group to benzaldehyde and imines.
Additionally, it is commonly used in combination with diiodomethane as a Simmons-Smith reagent to convert alkenes into cyclopropyl groups. It is less nucleophilic than related alkyllithium and Grignard reagents, so it may be used when a "softer" nucleophile is needed.
It is also used extensively in materials science chemistry as a zinc source in the synthesis of nanoparticles. Particularly in the formation of the zinc sulfide shell for core/shell-type quantum dots.
While in polymer chemistry, it can be used as part of the catalyst for a chain shuttling polymerization reaction, whereby it participates in living polymerization.

Diethylzinc is not limited to only being used in chemistry. Because of its high reactivity toward air, it was used in small quantities as a hypergolic or "self igniting" liquid rocket fuel—it ignites on contact with oxidizer, so the rocket motor need only contain a pump, without a spark source for ignition. Diethylzinc was also investigated by the United States Library of Congress as a potential means of mass deacidification of books printed on wood pulp paper. Diethylzinc vapour would, in theory, neutralize acid residues in the paper, leaving slightly alkaline zinc oxide residues. Although initial results were promising, the project was abandoned. A variety of adverse results prevented the method's adoption. Most infamously, the final prototype suffered damage in a series of explosions from contact between trace amounts of diethylzinc and water vapor in the chamber. This led the authors of the study to humorously comment:
In microelectronics, diethylzinc is used as a doping agent.

For corrosion protection in nuclear reactors of the light water reactor design, depleted zinc oxide is produced by first passing diethylzinc through an enrichment centrifuge.

The pyrophoricity of diethylzinc can be used to test the inert atmosphere inside a glovebox. An oxygen concentration of only a few parts per million will cause a bottle of diethylzinc to fume when opened.

Safety
Diethylzinc decomposes violently on contact with water and can spontaneously ignite upon contact with air. It should therefore be handled using inert atmosphere techniques.

References

External links
Demonstration of the ignition of diethylzinc in air Video - University of Nottingham

Reagents for organic chemistry
Organozinc compounds
Ethylating agents